Demeijerella xanthorhina is a moth of the family Tortricidae. It is only known from Papua New Guinea.

External links
tortricidae.com

Eucosmini
Moths described in 1954